Esben Lykke-Seest (July 10, 1905 – February 8, 1988) was a Norwegian child actor.

Lykke-Seest was the son of the writer, film producer, and film director Peter Lykke-Seest and the actress and children's author Lila Lykke-Seest. He appeared in three films in the 1910s directed by his father. He debuted in 1917 in De forældreløse, in which he played Lille-Jens (Little Johnny). In 1919 he appeared as Edvard in Æresgjesten, and he played the lead role of Esben in Historien om en gut. The three films are sometimes referred to as the "Esben films." Historien om en gut was a success in both Norway and internationally, and it led to an offer for him to play in Hollywood—which, however, he declined.

Filmography
1917: De forældreløse as Lille-Jens
1919: Æresgjesten as Edvard
1919: Historien om en gut as Esben

References

External links
 
 Esben Lykke-Seest at Filmfront

1905 births
1988 deaths
20th-century Norwegian male actors
Male actors from Oslo